Sadbhav Engineering Limited (SEL) is an Indian civil engineering and construction company headquartered in Ahmedabad. Founded in 1988 by Mr. Vishnubhai M. Patel, the company has implemented projects in the construction of roads & highways, bridges, mining and irrigation-supporting infrastructure. The company worked for clients including NHAI, DMRC, Sardar Sarovar Narmada Nigam, Coal India, L&T, HCC, Punj Lloyd and various others.

Sadbhav Engineering is listed on Bombay Stock Exchange (BSE) and National Stock Exchange (NSE) since 2001. As of August 2021, the market capitalization of the company stood at ₹1,058 crore.

Projects
Sadbhav Engineering, along with its subsidiary, Sadbhav Infrastructure Project Limited (SIPL) has executed some notable civil engineering as well as road and other infrastructure BOT projects:
 Ahmedabad-Dholera Expressway
 Eastern Peripheral Expressway (EPE)
 Yamunanagar Panchkula (Haryana)
 Mysore Bellary (Karnataka)
 Managuli to Devapura cross (Bijapur district and Yadagiri district )
 Delhi Metro Rail Corporation (DMRC)
 Sardar Sarovar Narmada Nigam Limited Canal Project
 Udaipur - Nathdwara Shrinath Ji tollway
 Jodhpur Ringroad
 Narmada River Main Canal
 Excavations for Vastan Mines of Gujarat Industries Power Corporation Limited (GIPCL)
 Sambalpur-Rourkela Road
 National Highway 8A from Samakhiyali to Bhachau in Gujarat
 National Highway 3 from Dhule to Madhya Pradesh
 Ranchi Ring Road
 National highway from Bhavnagar to Somnath

See also
 Larsen & Toubro
Punj Lloyd

References

Companies based in Ahmedabad
Companies based in Gujarat
Construction and civil engineering companies of India
Indian companies established in 1988
Construction and civil engineering companies established in 1988
1988 establishments in Gujarat
Companies listed on the National Stock Exchange of India
Companies listed on the Bombay Stock Exchange